Emily Jinjika (born 3 December 1985) is a former Zimbabwean woman cricketer. She played for Zimbabwe in the 2008 Women's Cricket World Cup Qualifier.

References 

1985 births
Living people
Zimbabwean women cricketers
Sportspeople from Harare